Milka Reponen  (born 31 March 1991) is a Finnish ski orienteering competitor.

She won a gold medal in the middle distance at the 2015 World Ski Orienteering Championships.

References

1991 births
Living people
Finnish orienteers
Ski-orienteers